Nowy Targ (literally: "New Market") is a town in Podhale, Lesser Poland, Poland, and the seat of the eponymous commune and county.

Nowy Targ may also refer to:

Places in Poland
 Gmina Nowy Targ, a gmina (municipality) in Nowy Targ County, Lesser Poland Voivodeship
 Nowy Targ County, Lesser Poland Voivodeship
 Nowy Targ, Pomeranian Voivodeship, a village in Stary Targ, Sztum, Pomerania

Other uses
 Nowy Targ Airport, in Nowy Targ County, Podhale, Lesser Poland, Poland
 KS Nowy Targ (disambiguation), several sports clubs

See also

 
 Nowotarski (disambiguation), adjectival form

 Targ (disambiguation)